The 2018–19 Creighton Bluejays men's basketball team represented Creighton University in the 2018–19 NCAA Division I men's basketball season. The Bluejays were led by ninth-year head coach Greg McDermott and played their home games at the newly-named CHI Health Center Omaha, as members of the Big East Conference. They finished the season 20–15, 9–9 in Big East play to finish in a four-way tie for third place. As the No. 5 seed in the Big East tournament, they lost to Xavier in the quarterfinals. They received a bid to the National Invitation Tournament as the No. 2 seed in the TCU bracket where they defeated Loyola and Memphis before losing to TCU in the quarterfinals.

Previous season
The Bluejays finished the 2017–18 season 21–12, 10–8 in Big East play to finish in a three-way tie for third place. They lost in the quarterfinals of the Big East tournament to Providence. They received an at-large bid to the NCAA tournament as the No. 8 seed in the South Region. There the Bluejays lost in the first round to Kansas State.

Offseason

Departures

In addition to the departing players, top assistant Darian DeVries left to take the head coaching vacancy at Drake. He had been with Creighton since 1998, first as an equipment manager and then from 2001 as an assistant coach.

Incoming transfers

2018 recruiting class

2019 recruiting class

Roster

Schedule and results

|-
!colspan=9 style=| Exhibition

|-
!colspan=9 style=| Non-conference regular season

|-
!colspan=9 style=|Big East regular season

|-
!colspan=9 style="|Big East Tournament

|-
!colspan=9 style="|NIT

References

2018–19 Big East Conference men's basketball season
2018-19
2018 in sports in Nebraska
2019 in sports in Nebraska
Creighton